Events in the year 1791 in Portugal.

Incumbents
Monarch: Mary I

Events

Arts and entertainment

Sports

Births

23 April – José Jorge Loureiro, soldier and politician (died 1860)

Deaths

18 October – João de Loureiro, Jesuit missionary and botanist (b. 1710/1717).

References

 
1790s in Portugal
Years of the 18th century in Portugal